Keith Bernard Whitmore (born November 28, 1945) is a former Bishop of the Episcopal Diocese of Eau Claire.

Biography
A native of Wisconsin, Whitmore is a graduate of the University of Wisconsin–Madison and Nashotah House. Whitmore was Bishop of the Eau Claire Diocese from 1999 to 2008. Currently, he is Assistant Bishop of the Episcopal Diocese of Atlanta. Previously, he served as Dean of Christ Cathedral in Salina, Kansas and as a military chaplain in the United States Army. Additionally, he has been a member of the Berkeley Divinity School Board of Trustees. Whitmore is married with two children. In 2019, he became the Assisting Bishop of North Dakota in the absence of a diocesan bishop.

See also
 List of Episcopal bishops of the United States
 Historical list of the Episcopal bishops of the United States

References

People from Wisconsin
Religious leaders from Wisconsin
United States Army officers
Military personnel from Wisconsin
Nashotah House alumni
University of Wisconsin–Madison alumni
Living people
United States Army chaplains
1945 births
Episcopal bishops of Eau Claire
Episcopal bishops of North Dakota